The ABA League Top Scorer, also known as the Adriatic League Top Scorer, is an award given to the Top Scorer of each season of the European regional Adriatic ABA League, which is the top-tier level professional basketball league for countries of the former Yugoslavia. The award has been given since the 2001–02 ABA League season.

Top scorers

See also
ABA League MVP
ABA League Finals MVP
ABA League Top Prospect
ABA League Ideal Starting Five
Player of the Month
List of Yugoslav First Federal Basketball League annual scoring leaders

References

External links
 Adriatic ABA League official website
 Adriatic ABA League page at Eurobasket.com

Top Scorer